Spring Education Group (SEG), is a for-profit private school company based in Saratoga, California. It is majority-owned by Primavera Capital Group, a Chinese-based investmentor. SEG's CEO is Shawn Weidmann.

History
In 2017 SEG purchased Stratford Schools, which operates pre-k through 8th grade schools in California, for $500 million in a leveraged buyout using $220 million in loans from Macquarie Group. Stratford was previously owned by Warburg Pincus, a private equity group.

BASIS Independent Schools
In April 2019 SEG purchased the five BASIS Independent Schools based in California, New York City, and Virginia. 190 parents at the pre-K-12 school in Red Hook, Brooklyn (opened 2014) and the pre-K-8 school in Manhattan (opened 2017) wrote a letter with concerns that BASIS was now owned by a Chinese-based private equity group. School tuition was approximately $32,000 per year.

Nobel Learning
In 2018, SEG and China-based Primavera Capital Group purchased Nobel Learning Communities from Investcorp. At the time, Nobel had 25,000 students at 190 schools in 19 states. It was founded in 1983 and purchased by Investcorp and Bahrain's Mumtalakat Holding Company (from Leeds Equity Partners) in 2015.

Nobel is based in West Chester, Pennsylvania and was listed on NASDAQ as NLCI. In 2010 their gross revenue was $232 million, with $29 million gross profit, and costs including total personnel costs of $112 million, rent-related costs $59 million, and school operations of $32 million. In 2006 Nobel's gross revenue was $160 million (with $23 million gross profit).

In 2010 Nobel purchased an online K-12 private school, Laurel Springs School, based in Ojai, California, for $13 million. It was founded in 1994 and accredited by Western Association of Schools and Colleges in 2000. In 2010 the school's gross revenue was $6.7 million, with personnel costs of $1.5 million.

On April 29, 2009 Nobel was sued in the Eastern District of Pennsylvania US District Court by the Disability Rights Section of the Civil Rights Division of the US DOJ for violating Title III of the Americans with Disabilities Act of 1990 by excluding children with disabilities from its schools and programs.

Nobel also operated Paladin Academy in Florida. The school was closed by Spring Education Group in 2021.

Other schools operated and trademarked by Nobel include Camelback Desert Schools, Chesterbrook Academy, Discovery Isle Child Development Center, Enchanted Care Learning Center, Merryhill School, Southern Highlands Preparatory School and The Honor Roll School.

COVID-19

On March 20, 2020, a worker at Touchstone Preschool in Hillsboro, Oregon, operated by SEG, tested positive for COVID-19. The preschool was closed for a deep cleaning and planned to remain closed for 14 days.

After 34 years in operation, a Merryhill preschool permanently closed for economic reasons in May 2020 in Modesto, California. Its financial standing had been made worse due to COVID-19 closures. It had leased space from Tenet Healthcare.

The temporary pandemic closures, making SEG's Debt-to-income ratio worse, caused Moody's Investors Service to change their credit rating for SEG from "stable" to "negative".

Approximately 21 preschools were closed by Spring Education Group in December 2020. At the time indicated as temporary, many have since become permanent. 38% of the company's schools in Florida, including Chesterbrook Academy and Paladin Academy ceased operations by June 2021.

Notable schools
Other notable schools operated by SEG include: 
 Sagemont School

References

External links
 
 Nobel Learning public filings at SEC

Private schools in the United States
Saratoga, California